Squam Lake is a lake located in the Lakes Region of central New Hampshire, United States, south of the White Mountains, straddling the borders of Grafton, Carroll, and Belknap counties. The largest town center on the lake is Holderness. The lake is located northwest of much larger Lake Winnipesaukee.

It drains via a short natural channel into Little Squam Lake, and then through a dam at the head of the short Squam River into the Pemigewasset at Ashland. Covering , Squam is the second-largest lake located entirely in New Hampshire.

Squam Lake was originally called Keeseenunknipee, which meant "the goose lake in the highlands". The white settlers that followed shortened the name to "Casumpa", "Kusumpy" and/or "Kesumpe" around 1779. In the early 19th century, the lake was given another Abenaki name, Asquam, which means "water". Finally, in the early 20th century, Asquam was shortened to its present version, Squam.

Squam Lake is much less commercialized than its neighbor Lake Winnipesaukee, which has waterfront attractions in Meredith, Weirs Beach, and other locations. Unlike the numerous businesses dotting the shores of Winnipesaukee, only a few are present on Squam, and none of them are located on Squam itself (there is an ice cream shop, a general store/marketplace, a restaurant, two marinas, and multiple gas stations on Little Squam). The Squam Lakes Association maintains only four boat-launching sites on the entire lake in order to keep it as quiet and private as possible.

The 1981 film On Golden Pond was filmed in the town of Center Harbor on Squam Lake. There are two tour boat services on the lake, both based in Holderness. One is Experience Squam, a private charter, and the other is the Squam Lakes Natural Science Center. Both services show filming locations and items of natural significance.

Squam Lake is a nesting site for common loons and is a good place to see them in breeding plumage during the summer months. Bald eagles and great blue herons are also known to nest on the lake.

The lake is classified as a cold- and warmwater fishery, with observed species including rainbow trout, landlocked salmon, lake trout, lake whitefish, smallmouth and largemouth bass, chain pickerel, horned pout, and white perch.

Islands

Squam Lake has about 30 named islands and numerous smaller, unnamed islets. The named islands are:

 Basin Island
 Birch Island
 Bowman Island
 Carnes Island
 Chocorua (Church) Island
 Duck Island
 Great Island 
 Groton Island
 High Haith 
 Hoag Island
 Hubble Island
 Kate Island
 Kent Island
 Kimball Island
 Laurel Island
 Little Loon Island (nesting site to bald eagles in 2003, 2005, 2006, 2012)
 Long Island
 Loon Island
 Merrill Island
 Mink Island
 Mooney (or Moon) Island
 Mouse Island
 Otter Island
 Perch Island
 Potato Island
 Sheep Island
 Three Sisters (three separate islands)
 Utopia Island
 Yard Island

See also

 List of lakes in New Hampshire
 Rockywold–Deephaven Camps

References

External links
 Squam Lakes Association
 Squam Lake / On Golden Pond visitors' website
 

 
Lakes of Carroll County, New Hampshire
Lakes of Belknap County, New Hampshire
New Hampshire placenames of Native American origin